Yūshi, Yushi or Yuushi is a masculine Japanese given name.

Possible writings
Yūshi can be written using different combinations of kanji characters. Some examples: 

勇志, "courage, determination"
勇史, "courage, history"
勇士, "courage, knight"
雄志, "masculine, determination"
雄史, "masculine, history"
雄士, "masculine, knight"
優志, "superiority, determination"
優史, "superiority, history"
優士, "superiority, knight"
祐志, "to help, determination"
祐史, "to help, history"
友志, "friend, determination"
友史, "friend, history"
有志, "to have, determination"
有史, "to have, history"
悠志, "long time, determination"
悠史, "long time, history"
侑士, "to urge, knight"

The name can also be written in hiragana ゆうし or katakana ユウシ.

Notable people with the name
, Japanese baseball player
, Japanese footballer
, Japanese photographer
, Japanese footballer
, Japanese baseball player
, Japanese footballer
, Japanese footballer

Japanese masculine given names